R (UNISON) v Lord Chancellor [2017] UKSC 51 is a UK labour law and UK constitutional law judgment of the Supreme Court of the United Kingdom. It held that fees for employment tribunals are unlawful because they impede access to justice, and defy the rule of law.

Facts
Unison claimed that fees for employment tribunals were ultra vires. The UK government introduced £1,200 fees to bring a typical case to an employment tribunal through the Employment Tribunals and the Employment Appeal Tribunal Fees Order 2013 (SI 2013/1893).

The Lord Chancellor purported to exercise this power under section 42(1) of the Tribunals, Courts and Enforcement Act 2007. Unison claimed that the order was ultra vires.

Judgment
The Supreme Court unanimously held that employment tribunal fees were unlawful.

See also

United Kingdom labour law

Notes

References
E McGaughey, A Casebook on Labour Law (Hart 2019) ch 3, 149

Supreme Court of the United Kingdom cases
2017 in British law
United Kingdom constitutional case law